Hugo Gerhard Simberg (24 June 1873 – 12 July 1917) was a Finnish symbolist painter and graphic artist.

Life and career

Simberg was born on 24 June 1873, at Hamina (in the original Swedish: Fredrikshamn), Finland, the son of Colonel Nicolai Simberg and Ebba Matilda Simberg (née Widenius). In 1891, at the age of 18, he enrolled at the Drawing School of the Viipuri Friends of Art, and he also studied at the Drawing School of the Finnish Art Society from 1893 to 1895. Then, in 1895, he decided to become the private pupil of Akseli Gallen-Kallela at his wilderness studio Kalela in Ruovesi. He studied under Gallen-Kallela for three periods between 1895 and 1897.

In 1896, Simberg went to London, and in 1897 to Paris and Italy. During these years he exhibited several works at the Finnish Artists' autumn exhibitions, including Autumn, Frost, The Devil Playing and Aunt Alexandra (1898), which were well received. Critical success led to his being made a member of the Finnish Art Association and to his being appointed to teach at the Drawing School of the Viipuri Friends of Art.

In 1904, he was commissioned to decorate the interior of St John's church in Tampere (now Tampere Cathedral), a project which he carried out with Magnus Enckell between 1904 and 1906. At the turn of the year 1907-08 he made a short visit to the United States. He also designed the UPM-Kymmene logo, the Griffon (1899).

From around 1907 to 1913, he taught at the Drawing School of the Finnish Art Association at Ateneum. In 1910, he married Anni Bremer. They had two children, Tom and Uhra-Beata, the latter of whom became a rya artist.

He died in Ähtäri on 12 July 1917. His biographer, Helena Ruuska, suspects that he battled an unknown disease, possibly syphilis, for a long time.

Style

Simberg's paintings emphasize mainly macabre and supernatural topics. Simberg's most famous painting is The Wounded Angel. Its titular character appears in the shape of a winged angel with a bandaged head, borne on a stretcher by two somberly dressed boys, one of whom looks toward the viewer with a serious expression. The painting is the best known of the artist's works and is especially famous in Finland. The Finnish symphonic metal band Nightwish released in 2007 a music video influenced by this painting,  "Amaranth".

Another famous painting is The Garden of Death, which, like many of Simberg's paintings, depicts a gloomy, otherworldly scene. The central figures are reminiscent of the classic black-clad Grim Reaper, but paradoxically are tending to gardens, traditionally symbols of birth or renewal.

Gallery

See also

Golden Age of Finnish Art
Art in Finland

Notes

References

Further reading
 S. Koja, ed. Nordic Dawn: Modernism's Awakening in Finland 1890-1920 [exhibition catalogue] (2005. Prestel)
 Hugo Simberg 1873-1917, ed. A. Olavinen [exhibition catalogue, Ateneum Art Museum, Helsinki] (2000)
 Hugo Simberg 1873-1917. His life & art [CD-rom, Ateneum Art Museum, Helsinki] (2000)

External links 

 Finnish National Gallery Collection of Simberg's works also on Flickr
 

1873 births
1917 deaths
People from Hamina
People from Viipuri Province (Grand Duchy of Finland)
Swedish-speaking Finns
Symbolist painters
20th-century Finnish painters
Finnish male painters
20th-century Finnish male artists